Eduardo Gutiérrez Valdivia (born 17 January 1925, date of death unknown) was a Bolivian football goalkeeper who played for Bolivia in the 1950 FIFA World Cup. Gutiérrez is deceased.

Career
Gutiérrez played at the 1949 South American Championship and earned 20 caps between 1947 and 1953. He also played for CD Ingavi and Always Ready La Paz.

References

External links

FIFA profile

1925 births
Year of death missing
Bolivian footballers
Bolivia international footballers
Association football goalkeepers
1949 South American Championship players
1950 FIFA World Cup players